
Gmina Rzeczniów is a rural gmina (administrative district) in Lipsko County, Masovian Voivodeship, in east-central Poland.

Villages
Gmina Rzeczniów contains the villages and settlements of Ciecierówka, Dubrawa, Grabowiec, Grechów, Jelanka, Kotłowacz, Marianów, Michałów, Osinki, Pasztowa Wola, Pasztowa Wola-Kolonia, Pawliczka, Płósy, Podkońce, Rybiczyzna, Rzechów-Kolonia, Rzeczniów, Rzeczniów-Kolonia, Rzeczniówek, Stary Rzechów, Wincentów, Wólka Modrzejowa, Wólka Modrzejowa-Kolonia and Zawały.

Neighbouring gminas
Gmina Rzeczniów is bordered by the gminas of Brody, Ciepielów, Iłża, Lipsko and Sienno.

References
Polish official population figures 2006

Rzeczniow
Lipsko County